Haroldo can refer to:

 Haroldo (footballer, 1896-unknown), full name Haroldo Domingues, Brazilian football midfielder
 Haroldo (footballer, 1937-1990), full name Theodorico Haroldo de Oliveira, Brazilian football centre-back
 Haroldo (footballer, born 1931), full name Haroldo Rodrigues Magalhães Castro, Brazilian football defender